Esmaeil Jabbarzadeh (1960 – 16 February 2022) was an Iranian reformist politician and a member of the Iranian Parliament who also served as Governor of East Azerbaijan, Iran from 2013 to 2017. He won a seat from Tabriz for parliament in Iranian legislative elections of 1992, 1996, 2000, and 2004 representing Executives of Construction Party.

Jabbarzadeh died from cardiac arrest on 16 February 2022.

References

1960 births
2022 deaths
People from Khoy
University of Tabriz alumni
Governors of East Azerbaijan Province
Deputies of Tabriz, Osku and Azarshahr
Members of the 4th Islamic Consultative Assembly
Members of the 5th Islamic Consultative Assembly
Members of the 6th Islamic Consultative Assembly
Members of the 7th Islamic Consultative Assembly
Academic staff of the University of Tabriz
Executives of Construction Party politicians
Islamic Revolutionary Guard Corps officers